The Anglican Consultative Council (ACC) is one of the four "Instruments of Communion" of the Anglican Communion.  It was created by a resolution of the 1968 Lambeth Conference.  The council, which includes Anglican bishops, other clergy, and laity, meets every two or three years in different parts of the world.

The Anglican Consultative Council has a permanent secretariat (the Anglican Communion Office), based at Saint Andrew's House, London, which is responsible for organizing meetings of the "Instruments of Communion".  The Archbishop of Canterbury is ex officio the President of the Council. The current chair of the ACC is Paul Kwong.

Membership
Members of the council include the Archbishop of Canterbury and a certain number of representatives of each of the Anglican provinces, depending on the size of the province.

The largest provinces are entitled to appoint three representatives, consisting of one bishop, one priest, and one layperson.  Intermediate sized provinces may appoint two persons: one layperson and one ordained (either bishop or priest).  The smallest provinces appoint only one person, preferably from among the laity.  Additionally, the Council may co-opt up to six additional members of whom two shall be women and two persons not over 28 years of age at the time of appointment.

If the chairperson or the vice-chair of the council should be elected to this position for a term which exceeds the term of his or her appointment to the council, his or her council membership is extended until the expiration of the term as chair, while the province to which he or she belongs is entitled to make an additional appointment.

For the purposes of apportioning the membership on the Anglican Consultative Council, the large provinces are considered to be:

Anglican Church of Australia
Anglican Church of Canada
Church of England
Church of Nigeria (Anglican Communion)
Church of the Province of Rwanda
Church of the Province of Southern Africa
Church of South India
Anglican Church of Tanzania
Church of the Province of Uganda
The Episcopal Church (TEC)

Intermediate-sized provinces are:
Anglican Church of Aotearoa, New Zealand, and Polynesia
Church of the Province of Central Africa
Province of the Anglican Church of the Congo
Church of Ireland
Anglican Church of Kenya
Church of North India 
Church of Pakistan
Episcopal Church of the Sudan 
Church in Wales 
Church in the Province of the West Indies

The smallest provinces include:
Church of Bangladesh 
Anglican Episcopal Church of Brazil 
Church of the Province of Burundi 
Anglican Church in Central America 
Church of Ceylon 
Hong Kong Sheng Kung Hui
Church of the Province of the Indian Ocean 
Nippon Sei Ko Kai (Anglican Church in Japan) 
Episcopal Church in Jerusalem and the Middle East
Anglican Church of Korea 
Church of the Province of Melanesia 
Anglican Church of Mexico 
Church of the Province of Myanmar 
Anglican Church of Papua New Guinea 
Episcopal Church in the Philippines 
Anglican Church of South America 
Scottish Episcopal Church
Church of the Province of Southeast Asia 
Church of the Province of West Africa

Functions

According to the 1968 resolution, the council has eight functions:
To share information about developments in one or more provinces with the other parts of the Communion and to serve as needed as an instrument of common action.
To advise on inter-Anglican, provincial, and diocesan relationships, including the division of provinces, the formation of new provinces and of regional councils, and the problems of extraprovincial dioceses.
To develop as far as possible agreed Anglican policies in the world mission of the Church and to encourage national and regional Churches to engage together in developing and implementing such policies by sharing their resources of manpower, money, and experience to the best advantage of all.
To keep before national and regional Churches the importance of the fullest possible Anglican collaboration with other Christian Churches.
To encourage and guide Anglican participation in the ecumenical movement and the ecumenical organisations; to co-operate with the World Council of Churches and the world confessional bodies on behalf of the Anglican Communion; and to make arrangements for the conduct of pan-Anglican conversations with the Roman Catholic Church, the Eastern Orthodox Churches, and other Churches.
To advise on matters arising out of national or regional Church union negotiations or conversations and on subsequent relations with united Churches.
To advise on problems on inter-Anglican communication and to help in the dissemination of Anglican and ecumenical information.
To keep in review the needs that may arise for further study and, where necessary, to promote inquiry and research.

Important meetings

2005
 
The 13th meeting of the ACC was concerned with the controversy surrounding the policies about homosexuality, particularly the consecration of openly homosexual bishops. A resolution to expel the American and Canadian provinces from all church bodies was rejected. An alternative resolution was  passed by a vote of 30 to 28. It stated support in the Anglican Communion to reaffirmed “the standard of Christian teaching on matters of human sexuality expressed in the 1998 Lambeth Resolution 1.10, It also repeated the position stated at the 2005 Primates' Meeting, that the Episcopal Church (USA) and the Anglican Church of Canada needed to "voluntarily withdraw their members" from the ACC—including its "Standing Committee and the Inter-Anglican Finance and Administration Committee" until the next Lambeth Conference in 2008.

2016
The 2016 meeting of the ACC made its Resolutions against a background of contentious debates and divided votes regarding homosexuality in the 1998 Lambeth Conference and the boycott by 230 bishops including six Prelates of the 2008 Lambeth Conference over the same issue. It seemed after these two conferences that the homosexuality issue might break up the Anglican Communion. Against this background, continued unity of the Lambeth Communion was endorsed by an ACC Resolution that affirmed “the commitment of the Primates of the Anglican Communion to walk together; and commits to continue to seek appropriate ways for the provinces of the Anglican Communion to walk together with each other and with the Primates and other Instruments of Communion”.

List of Anglican Consultative Council meetings
  Limuru, Kenya (1971)
  Dublin, Ireland (1973)
  Trinidad and Tobago (1976)
  London, Ontario, Canada (1979)
  Newcastle-upon-Tyne, England (1981)
  Badagry, Nigeria (1984)
  Singapore (1987)
  Wales (1990)
  Cape Town, South Africa (1993)
  Panama (1996)
  Dundee, Scotland (1999)
  Hong Kong (2002)
  Nottingham, England (2005)
  Kingston, Jamaica (2009)
  Auckland, New Zealand (2012)
  Lusaka, Zambia (2016)
Hong Kong (2019)
Accra, Ghana (2023)

Secretary General
The Council employs a Secretary General as a sort of ambassador of and between the Anglican churches; they are based at the Anglican Communion Office in London and sometimes (erroneously) referred to as Secretary General of the Anglican Communion. Prior to the creation of the ACC, there was a similar post called "Executive Officer of the Anglican Communion"; the last "Anglican Executive Officer" became the first Secretary-General and the Anglican Communion Office numbers Idowu-Fearon as the seventh Secretary-General.

Executive Officers
1 January 19601964: Stephen F. Bayne Jr., former Bishop of Olympia, was also responsible for the American Episcopal churches of Europe
1 November 19641969: Ralph Dean, Bishop of Cariboo, Canada, took leave from his diocese (but retained the See) in order to serve as Executive Officer, based in his native London
1 May 19691971: John Howe, former Bishop of St Andrews, Dunkeld and Dunblane, Scotland

Secretaries General
1 March 197131 December 1982 (res.): John Howe, previously Anglican Executive Officer
1 January 198331 December 1994 (ret.): Sam Van Culin, former Executive for World Mission, The Episcopal Church. Samuel Van Culin (born 1930, Honolulu) was ordained on 30 November 1955 at St Andrew's Cathedral, Honolulu.
1 January 199531 December 2004: John L. Peterson, former Dean of St. George's College, Jerusalem. John Louis Peterson (born 17 December 1942, Wadena, Minnesota) was ordained in 1976 by Charles E. Bennison Sr., Bishop of Western Michigan.
18 January 2005"late" 2014: Kenneth Kearon (became Bishop of Limerick and Killaloe, Ireland)
4 September 2015present: Josiah Idowu-Fearon, former Archbishop of Kaduna, Nigeria
August 2022 onwards (announced): Anthony Poggo, former Bishop of Kajo-Keji, South Sudan

References

External links
Official website

Anglican organizations
Anglican Communion